The 2007 Nigerian Senate election in Bauchi State was held on April 21, 2007, to elect members of the Nigerian Senate to represent Bauchi State. Mohammed A. Muhammed representing Bauchi Central and Bala Mohammed representing Bauchi South won on the platform of All Nigeria Peoples Party, while Sulaiman Mohammed Nazif representing Bauchi North won on the platform of the Action Congress.

Overview

Summary

Results

Bauchi Central 
The election was won by Mohammed A. Muhammed of the All Nigeria Peoples Party.

Bauchi South 
The election was won by Bala Mohammed of the All Nigeria Peoples Party.

Bauchi North 
The election was won by Sulaiman Mohammed Nazif of the Action Congress.

References 

April 2007 events in Nigeria
Bauchi State Senate elections
Bau